The Autódromo Hermanos Rodríguez is a  motorsport race track in Mexico City, Mexico, named after the racing drivers Ricardo (1942–1962) and Pedro Rodríguez (1940–1971). The circuit got its name shortly after it opened when Ricardo Rodríguez died in practice for the non-Championship 1962 Mexican Grand Prix. Ricardo's brother Pedro was also killed behind the wheel nine years later. Since 2015, the track has once again hosted the Formula One Mexican Grand Prix, an event it previously hosted in two separate periods on a different layout, the last occasion of which was in 1992.

The circuit is located within the public park of the Magdalena Mixhuca Sports City in southeast Mexico City. The circuit is owned by the Government of the City, but is currently operated under concession by Corporación Interamericana de Entretenimiento (CIE) through OCESA, one of CIE's subsidiaries. CIE also organizes the NASCAR and Desafío Corona races in this circuit and rents the circuits to other parties, including race organizers, automobile clubs and track amateurs for fees that are controversial due to their disproportionately high amounts compared to other ex-F1 courses.

The NASCAR Xfinity Series started racing at Autódromo Hermanos Rodríguez in the 2005 season and ended in the 2008 season. Martin Truex Jr. won the race in 2005, and Denny Hamlin won in 2006. For the 2007 race, the chicane was removed to increase passing opportunities down the front straight and into turn 1, and Juan Pablo Montoya from Bogotá, Colombia, won the race. Kyle Busch was the winner of the race in 2008.

The A1 Grand Prix series started racing at Autódromo Hermanos Rodríguez in the 2006–07 season using the full-track configuration used by Formula One. Alex Yoong from Malaysia won the sprint race and Oliver Jarvis from the United Kingdom won the feature race. In the 2007–08 season, Jonny Reid from New Zealand won the sprint race and Adam Carroll of Team Ireland won the feature race.

History

Built in the Magdalena Mixhuca public park in 1959, the circuit hosted its first Formula One Grand Prix in 1962, as a non-Championship race. The following year the Mexican Grand Prix became a full World Championship event.  The circuit remained part of the F1 calendar through 1970, when spectator overcrowding caused unsafe conditions.  When F1 returned in 1986, the circuit boasted a new pit complex, as well as improved safety all around, but left again after 1992 due to safety concerns.

In 2001 CIE and Forsythe Racing tasked D3 Motorsport Development with revamping the circuit. A redesign to include the Foro and a complete upgrade of the circuit was done. It saw a record crowd of 402,413 people attend a round of the CART Championship in 2002. 

It was announced in May 2012, that the circuit would again host the Mexican Grand Prix from 2013, in a five-year deal that would see it replace the European Grand Prix in Valencia, but this did not happen. The FIA listed the Mexican Grand Prix as the 19th round of the provisional schedule for the 2014 season, but it was not on the final schedule. The Mexican Grand Prix was listed on the 2015 Formula One calendar published by the FIA on 3 December 2014, with Formula One making its return to the circuit with the race on 1 November 2015.

The racetrack is also home to Electric Daisy Carnival (EDC Mexico), a music festival attended by over 200,000 people.

The Grand Prix circuit 

Designed as his thesis by student Óscar Fernández in 1953, the circuit has an elevation of 2,238 m (7,342 ft); the thin air causes difficulties for both the drivers and their cars. It also reduces the levels of aerodynamic drag that cars experience, meaning that higher downforce setups can be used with less impact on straight-line speed.

The circuit has an extremely fast final corner (the Peraltada, turn 17) before a long start/finish straight, and thus reminded some of Monza; however, unlike Monza's Parabolica curve, the Peraltada curve is slightly banked, allowing even more speed through the corner. It was at this corner that the younger Rodríguez crashed, due to suspension failure. After the last F1 Mexican Grand Prix in 1992, a baseball stadium called the "Foro" was built on the inner part of this curve. When the Champ Car series began using the track in 2002, the Peraltada curve was partially bypassed by a series of sharp turns entering and exiting the Foro; re-entering the Peraltada halfway through.

After the Peraltada comes the long 1.2 km front straight.

In the 2005 NASCAR Busch Series season, there was a chicane on the main straightaway to slow the cars down. They also introduced a curve between the short course and the Ese del Lago to bypass the latter, but avoiding the stadium detour.

The front straight was slightly extended and reprofiled to accommodate a new media center and paddock. The iconic esses between turns 7 and 13 were significantly modified; the prolific, high radius turns largely diminished and some replaced with fixed angle turns. The baseball field portion of the track was also altered to a low-speed left-right combination that bypassed the first half of the Peraltada, allowing the cars to re-enter the Peraltada halfway through the corner. However, the modern V6 hybrid turbo F1 cars actually managed to reach top speeds in excess of  down the main straight.

Layout history

Oval track 

The circuit also features an oval layout due to the inclusion of a flat turn that goes from the middle of the main straight to the beginning of the backstretch of circuit. Unlike the road course, the oval is raced in counter-clockwise direction (except for the Formula E race).

The oval configuration of this Mexico City facility is arguably the most dangerous racetrack in Mexico, because of the limited visibility at the exit of turns 2 and 4. This is because the Foro Sol baseball stadium is located inside turns 1 and 2; and several trees are located inside turns 3 and 4.

During the 2006 season, two accidents occurred in the oval track during NASCAR Mexico T4 Series events, which took several drivers out of the race, with some needing hospital treatment.

The oval configuration is used at least twice a year, with two double-feature events featuring the NASCAR Toyota Series and the NASCAR Mexico T4 Series.

The oval configuration also forms the base of the FIA Formula E Championship circuit for the Mexico City ePrix; the oval is raced clockwise, but there is a chicane prior to the entrance of turn 4, with a second chicane on the backstretch, followed by a modified Foro Sol section that exits for the full Peraltada, and a third chicane midway through the Peraltada (turns 1 and 2 of the oval). FIA Formula E track design was modified by Agustin Delicado Zomeño. Starting from season 3 (2016–2017), the first chicane is removed and now it is a right-hand corner.

In season 6, the track is extended and the two chicanes at the back straight and the Peraltada are removed. The track also uses more of the Formula 1 layout. After turn 2 (Formula E track), the track will turn left instead of right and the extended part includes a 4-turn sequence before going back to the original circuit and the stadium section.

Renamed turns 
Before the 1986 Formula One race, the first turn (now turns 1-3) was named in honour of Moisés Solana, Mexico's third F1 driver. It is still called Ese Moisés Solana, often referred to as the "Solana Complex" in English.

In September 2002, Mexico's fourth and, then most recent, F1 driver Héctor Rebaque's achievements both in F1 and CART were recognized by renaming turn 6 of the Autodromo as Recorte Rebaque instead of the previous name of Recorte de Gran Premio.

In 2015, turn 17 was named in honour of Nigel Mansell, twice winner of the Mexican Grand Prix in 1987 and 1992 and the scene of his daring pass around the outside of Gerhard Berger in 1990.

On September 20, 2016 Adrián Fernández's achievements have been recognized by the naming of turn 12 of the Autodromo in his honour.

Events

 Current

 January: FIA Formula E Championship Mexico City ePrix, Campeonato Mexicano de Súper Turismos Gran Premio Víctor Jiménez
 April: Campeonato Mexicano de Súper Turismos Gran Premio Motul, NACAM Formula 4 Championship
 May: Campeonato Mexicano de Súper Turismos Gran Premio Javier Osorio
 June: Campeonato Mexicano de Súper Turismos SpeedFest
 July: Campeonato Mexicano de Súper Turismos Gran Premio Pedro Rodriguez, NACAM Formula 4 Championship
 August: Campeonato Mexicano de Súper Turismos SpeedFest, NACAM Formula 4 Championship
 October: Formula One Mexico City Grand Prix, NACAM Formula 4 Championship
 November: NASCAR Mexico Series, NASCAR Mikel's Truck Series, Campeonato Mexicano de Súper Turismos SpeedFest La Batalla Final
 December: Endurance 24 #powered by Motul, NACAM Formula 4 Championship

 Former

 A1 Grand Prix (2007–2008)
 Atlantic Championship (1980–1982)
 CART/Champ Car World Series Gran Premio Tecate (1980–1981, 2002–2007)
 FIA World Endurance Championship 6 Hours of Mexico (2016–2017)
 Fórmula de las Américas/Mexican Formula 3000 Championship (1996–2001)
 Formula One Mexican Grand Prix (1962–1970, 1986–1992, 2015–2019)
 Fórmula Panam (2003–2005, 2007–2008, 2012–2013, 2015–2018)
 Grand Am Rolex Sports Car Series Mexico City 250 (2005–2008)
 IMSA GT Championship (1974)
 Jaguar I-Pace eTrophy (2019–2020)
 LATAM Challenge Series (2011–2013)
 Mexican Formula Three Championship (1990–2001)
 NASCAR Mikel's Truck Series (2002–2003, 2017–2019, 2022)
 NASCAR Mexico Series (2004–2019, 2022)
 NASCAR Xfinity Series Corona México 200 (2005–2008)      
 Porsche Supercup (2017–2019)
 Race of Champions (2019)
 Trans-Am Series 1000 km of Mexico City (1978–1979, 1991)
 United States Road Racing Championship (1968)
 World Series Formula V8 3.5 (2017)
 World Sportscar Championship Trofeo Hermanos Rodríguez (1989–1991)

Lap records 

The official lap record for the current circuit layout is 1:17.774, set by Valtteri Bottas driving for Mercedes in the 2021 Mexico City Grand Prix, while the unofficial all-time track record is 1:14.758, set by Max Verstappen driving for Red Bull Racing in the qualifying of the 2019 Mexican Grand Prix. The official race lap records at the Autódromo Hermanos Rodríguez are listed as:

The baseball stadium 

The Autódromo includes a baseball stadium inside turn 14 (Peraltada). The stadium, called Foro Sol, was home to the Diablos Rojos del México and also hosts music concerts. Some of the artists who played there include Iron Maiden, Paul McCartney, Metallica, Pink Floyd, Santana, The Rolling Stones, Madonna, Stone Temple Pilots, Nine Inch Nails, U2, Radiohead, and Guns N' Roses. The Diablos Rojos later left Foro Sol in order to build a new baseball stadium named Estadio Alfredo Harp Helú, which was later completed on 23 March, 2019. Unlike Foro Sol, it was built inside of the race track near turns 1 and 3.

Notes

References

External links 
 
 Autódromo Hermanos Rodríguez Page at GrandPrix.com (focusing on Formula One history)
 Autódromo Hermanos Rodríguez on Google Maps

Sports venues in Mexico City
Hermanos
Mexican Grand Prix
Mexico City ePrix
Champ Car circuits
Hermanos
Hermanos
A1 Grand Prix circuits
IMSA GT Championship circuits
Formula E circuits
1962 establishments in Mexico
Sports venues completed in 1962